Joona Tiainen (born 7 May 2000) is a Finnish professional footballer who plays for FC Lahti as a goalkeeper.

References

2000 births
Living people
Finnish footballers
FC Lahti players
FC Kuusysi players
FC Espoo players
Reipas Lahti players
Kakkonen players
Veikkausliiga players
Association football goalkeepers